Romanați may refer to:
Romanați County
Romanați River